Congregation Amijai is a Conservative Jewish Synagogue in Buenos Aires, Argentina.

History 

In 1993 several Jewish families in the Belgrano neighborhood of Buenos Aires decided to form a new Masorti synagogue and chose Darío Feiguin as their Rabbi. The name of the new synagogue, "Amijai" means "my nation lives" in Hebrew. Their first few services were held at the Seminario Rabínico Latinoamericano. In 2001, thanks to a donation from businessman Natalio Garber, former owner of Musimundo, the congregation purchased an old safe factory next to Chinatown to construct their own building.

The congregation chose architecture firm Urgell-Penedo-Urgell, winner of the Konex Award for architecture to design their building. The building took 16 months to complete and involved input from a variety of different architects. After the 1994 AMIA Bombing, the synagogue was built to be bomb-proof.

In total, the space takes up about 3,500 m2. The building includes a community dining hall, classrooms, administrative offices for staff and Rabbis, a library and meeting spaces. The building was constructed out of reinforced concrete and includes a V-shaped roof which allows for 25 meters of light to enter the building.

The main temple is used for concerts and is known for its good acoustics.

In 2008 the building won the First Prize in Architecture from the Government of the Ciudad Autónoma de Buenos Aires as one of the best examples of architecture in the city. The doors of the main temple are made of natural bronze. The Altar was made of carved wood by local artists. The main temple seats 900 people. The architectural work was selected for the 2012 Venice Biennale and was featured in that year's arts and architecture catalog.

Religious life 

Congregation Amijai is dedicated to the study of Torah. It respects the dietary laws of kashrut. As a conservative synagogue, religious life is egalitarian. Women count toward a minyan, can read Torah during religious services, wear a Kippah, a Tallit and/or Tefillin. The synagogue also considers Organ donation to be a Mitzvah. The congregation believes "in a Judaism far from bourgeois comfort, ignorance, individualism, compulsion and fear."

The synagogue gives back charitably to the community, with monthly tzedakah collections, collaboration with the local non-profit Sonrisas in the town of Esteban Echeverría, a community dining room/soup kitchen for homeless and low income residents and winter clothing drives.

The Congregation supports the Argentine Ecumenical Movement and participates in the National Plan for Cultural Equality.

In 2014 Congregation Amijai's Rabbi Alejandro Avruj joined Pope Francis as part of the interfaith delegation of the Pope's visit to the Middle East. Rabbi Avruj worked alongside the Pontiff on social justice related issues when the latter was Archbishop of Buenos Aires and thus was invited to participate as part of the delegation.

Arts and culture 

During the construction of the building, a design contest was held for a Tree of life art piece in the temple garden to honor the memory of congregants' loved ones. Submissions were submitted anonymously with pseudonyms, and a design by Clorindo Testa was chosen. The aim of the piece was to have bronze leaves representing lost loved ones illuminated by an eternal flame.

The synagogue holds regular concerts, lectures, ballet, theatre and dance performances. The music performances include a variety of different genres, including jazz, klezmer, zarzuela, tango, classical, chamber music, folk music, rock, religious music, country,  and ópera.

The synagogue was gifted a 19th-century Steinway piano by an anonymous patron which has now become one of its most active musical assets. They have welcomed performances by Darío Volonté, Daniel Barenboim, Luis Alberto Spinetta, Camerata Bariloche, Pinchas Zukerman, the Russian National Orchestra,  the Harlem Opera Theater, the Youth Symphony Orchestra of Hesse, la Kammerphilarmonie de Frankfurt, Martha Argerich, Sandra Mihanovich, Bruno Gelber, Atilio Stampone, Hermeto Pascoal, Chango Spasiuk, Jaime Torres,  Pedro Aznar, among others.

The 2008 series «Grandes Virtuosos del Violín» was highlighted as the most significant event of the year by Argentinean Association of Music Critics. The series included the International Violin Competition of Buenos Aires.

In an attempt to foster peace between Jews and Palestinians, the synagogue organizes and promotes recitals and concerts with both Jewish and Palestinian artists.

See also 

 Marshall Meyer
 Movimiento Judío por los Derechos Humanos
 Seminario Rabínico Latinoamericano
 Comunidad Bet El
 Comunidad Emanu El

References 

 Turismo judaico
 Crisis en la Fundación Judaica Radio Jai 29 November 2013

External links 

 AMIJAI

2002 architecture
Conservative Judaism in Argentina
Synagogues in Argentina
Conservative synagogues
Buildings and structures completed in 2002